Nino Kouter (born 19 December 1993) is a Slovenian footballer who plays as a defensive midfielder for Slovenian PrvaLiga side Celje.

Club career
Kouter made his senior debut for Mura 05 in the Slovenian Second League on 8 August 2010, coming on as a substitute in the 66th minute for Marko Smodiš in the home match against Interblock, which finished as a 1–1 draw.

International career
Kouter made his international debut for Slovenia on 3 September 2020 in the UEFA Nations League match against Greece, coming on as a substitute in the 78th minute for Jaka Bijol, with the home match finishing as a 0–0 draw.

Career statistics

International

Honours
FC Bad Radkersburg
Oberliga Süd Ost: 2016–17

Mura
Slovenian PrvaLiga: 2020–21
Slovenian Cup: 2019–20
Slovenian Second League: 2017–18

References

External links
 Nino Kouter at NZS 
 
 

1993 births
Living people
People from Murska Sobota
Slovenian footballers
Slovenia youth international footballers
Slovenia international footballers
Association football midfielders
Slovenian expatriate footballers
Slovenian expatriate sportspeople in Austria
Expatriate footballers in Austria
Slovenian expatriate sportspeople in Turkey
Expatriate footballers in Turkey
ND Mura 05 players
NK Zavrč players
NŠ Mura players
Manisa FK footballers
NK Celje players
Slovenian Second League players
Slovenian PrvaLiga players
TFF First League players